Llewellyn Lloyd Ashcroft (10 July 1921 – 13 June 2005) was a Welsh footballer, who played as an outside right for Flint Town and Tranmere Rovers.

References

1921 births
Flint Town United F.C. players
Tranmere Rovers F.C. players
2005 deaths
Colwyn Bay F.C. players
English Football League players
Association football wingers
Welsh footballers